Stal Ostrów Wielkopolski, also known as  Arged BM Slam Stal Ostrów Wielkopolski for sponsorship reasons, is a Polish basketball team, based in Ostrów Wielkopolski. They play in the Polish Basketball League (PLK) since its promotion back in 2015. The club won the Polish national championship in 2021 and the Polish Cup in 2019 and 2022. Since then, Stal has also been active at the European stage in the Basketball Champions League and FIBA Europe Cup.

The home arena of the team is the Arena Ostrów.

History

In 2015, Stal promoted from the second-tier I Liga to the PLK. In its first season, the team finished 13th in the standings with a 12–20 record. In the 2016–17 season, Stal had a historic season as the team reached the semi-finals of the PLK after defeating MKS Dąbrowa Górnicza 3–0 in the quarter-finals. In the semi-finals, Stal lost to Stelmet Zielona Góra but won the third place series against Energa Czarni Słupsk.

In the 2017–18 season, Stal had an even more successful season as the team reached the PLK finals for the first time after defeating Polski Cukier Toruń. In the Finals, the team lost to Anwil Włocławek, 2–4.

In 2019, Stal won the Polish Basketball Cup after defeating Arka Gdynia 77–74 in the final. It was the first ever trophy for the club.

In the 2020–21 season, Stal played in the FIBA Europe Cup and reached the Final Four of the tournament. It reached the finals were it lost to Israeli club Ironi Ness Ziona. Later that season, Stal won the finals of the 2020–21 PLK season, winning its first Polish championship in club history. Guard Jakub Garbacz was named the PLK Finals MVP.

Arenas
In the majority of its existence, the team played in the Hala Sportowa Stal, which had a capacity of 1,800 people. Since 2020, the club plays its home games in the Arena Ostrów, which has capacity for 3,000 people. The arena costed 31 million zł and was built by local company Bud-Rem.

Honours
Polish Basketball League
Winners (1): 2020-21
Polish Basketball Cup
Winners (2): 2019, 2022
Polish Basketball Supercup
Winners (1): 2022
Runners-up (2): 2019, 2021
FIBA Europe Cup
Runners-up (1): 2020–21

Sponsorship names
The team has also been known as:
BM Slam Stal Ostrów Wielkopolski (2012–2013)
Intermarché Bricomarché (2013–2015)
BM Slam Stal Ostrów Wielkopolski (2015–present)

Season by season

European record

Players

Current roster

Depth chart

Notable players

Individual awards

References

Basketball teams in Poland
Basketball teams established in 1947
Stal